How the Toys Saved Christmas is a 1996 Italian animated film directed by Enzo D'Alò, based on a tale by Gianni Rodari.

In the original version, the story took place during the Epiphany Eve, because in the Folklore of Italy the Befana is a good witch that gives presents and candies to the children during the night between 5 and 6 January.

Plot 
On the Epiphany Eve, La Befana falls ill and must take off for a night, recruiting Scarafoni to help deliver all the toys that must go to the Italian children. No one but the toys knows that Scarafoni plans to auction off the toys to the highest bidder, which means that the toys won't make it to the children who have been good all year and therefore deserve them. The toys decide to deliver themselves: the story follows them as they struggle to avoid the heartless Scarafoni and to find their true homes.

Meanwhile, a young boy named Francesco wishes to receive as an Epiphany present the model of the Freccia Azzurra (Blue Arrow), the train where his late father used to work on. While Scarafoni is out looking for the escaping toys, a couple of burglars, Lesto and Scarpa, kidnap Francesco and force him to sneak inside the Befana's shop and taking away all the money. Francesco, instead, uses the telephone inside the shop to call the police who arrest the burglars; Befana understands that Francesco is not involved in the attempted robbery and, with much gratitude, exonerates Francesco.

Of all the toys, the plush dog Spicciola wishes to be given to Francesco. During the evening, after a fight against Scarafoni that splits him from the group, Spicciola turns into a real dog. The next morning, Spicciola finds Francesco and the two bonds immediately.

In the end, all the toys manage to deliver themselves to the children in their homes, but Scarafoni still has the money. However, everyone rushes to the toy shop and find Scarafoni with the money and the people manage to get it back from him, as Scarafoni is arrested by the police who sent him to prison. Befana, after having found that her illness was provoked by Scarafoni himself, who gave her a light poison instead of medicine, hires Francesco as her new helper, joined by Spicciola.

U.S. version 
In 1997, the film was imported to the U.S. and released direct-to-video by Buena Vista Home Video, under the title "How the Toys Saved Christmas" (although, as shown in the previews, originally going to be titled "The Toys Who Saved Christmas").

The film featured Mary Tyler Moore as the voice for the Befana, renamed "Granny Rose" and described as Santa Claus' helper, Tony Randall as Scarafoni, renamed "Mr. Grimm", Michael Caloz as Francesco, renamed "Christopher Winter", and Sonja Ball as Spicciola the dog, renamed Jingles. Instead of being set during the Epiphany Eve, the film is set on Christmas Eve.

The plot is otherwise very similar to the original Italian version, with some minor alterations. Rather than desiring the Blue Arrow for himself, Christopher Winter writes to Santa on behalf of his friend Charlie, a fellow orphan and the one who ultimately receives the train as his gift. For himself, Christopher asks for "one special friend", making his adoption of Jingles a fulfillment of his actual wish in this version.

The film also had some scenes from the original Italian release deleted or placed before other scenes, along with some music scores taken out and new music added in.

Cast

Home media 
Buena Vista Home Video released the film in its English-dubbed version on DVD in 2003. Echo Bridge Home Entertainment re-released the film on DVD in 2011.

See also 
 List of Christmas films
Toy Story – a 1995 computer-animated film
The Christmas Toy – a 1986 Jim Henson's TV special
The Brave Little Toaster – a 1987 animated film
The Little Engine That Could – a 1991 animated short film

References

External links 

1996 films
1996 animated films
1990s children's fantasy films
Italian animated films
Italian Christmas films
Films directed by Enzo D'Alò
Films about sentient toys
Miramax films
Miramax animated films
Films about toys
Animated films about dogs
Animated films about bears
Animated films about birds
Films about race and ethnicity
Indigenous films
1990s Christmas films
Films based on European myths and legends
1990s children's animated films
1990s Italian films